Wartime Romance is a 1983 Soviet film directed by Pyotr Todorovsky.  It tells the story of a soldier and a nurse separated by World War II and briefly reunited in 1950.

Plot
Sasha is a former Red Army soldier married to a teacher and attending a university. He also works as a motion picture operator at a local theatre. One winter day, he meets a gruffish woman street vendor with a child. Sasha recognizes her to be Lyuba, a former military nurse he worshipped during the war. He starts dating her and looking after her child. After learning about their affair, Sasha's wife invites Lyuba to their kommunalka and throws a little party for the lovers.

Sasha proves to be too mild-mannered to keep Lyuba under control once she regained her former beauty and self-esteem. She starts a relationship with a local Communist party official. Sasha eventually comes to understand that Lyuba is not the ideal woman he once thought her to be. He is reunited with his patient wife.

Cast
 Nikolai Burlyayev as Netuzhilin
 Natalya Andrejchenko as Lyuba
 Inna Churikova as Vera
 Yekaterina Yudina as Kat'ka  
 Zinovy Gerdt as Administrator 
 Yelena Kozelkova as Administrator's wife  
 Viktor Proskurin as Novikov 
 Vsevolod Shilovsky as Grisha  
 Aleksandr Martynov as Kombat  
 Natalya Chenchik as Lotochnitsa  
 Vladimir Yuryev as Malyanov  
 Yuriy Dubrovin as Terekhin

Awards and nominations
 The film was nominated for the Academy Award for Best Foreign Language Film.
 Inna Churikova won the Silver Bear for Best Actress at the 34th Berlin International Film Festival.

See also
 List of submissions to the 57th Academy Awards for Best Foreign Language Film
 List of Soviet submissions for the Academy Award for Best Foreign Language Film

References

External links

1983 films
1983 romantic drama films
Soviet romantic drama films
1980s Russian-language films
Odesa Film Studio films
Films directed by Pyotr Todorovsky
Russian romantic drama films